Novo-Troitsk is a rural locality (a selo) in Turochaksky District, the Altai Republic, Russia. The population was 39 as of 2016. There are 10 streets.

Geography 
Novo-Troitsk is located 85 km south of Turochak (the district's administrative centre) by road. Iogach is the nearest rural locality.

References 

Rural localities in Turochaksky District